The Auster J/5 Alpine was a 1950s British single-engined four-seat high-wing training and touring monoplane built by Auster Aircraft Limited at Rearsby, Leicestershire.

History
The Alpine was a hybrid aircraft based on the fuselage of the J/5 Aiglet Trainer fitted with the wings from the J-1 Autocrat. The prototype was converted from an Auster J-5L Aiglet Trainer.

Variants

 Auster J/5R Alpine – production version with de Havilland Gipsy Major 10 engine, six built.
 Auster J/5Q Alpine – lower-powered version with a de Havilland Gipsy Major 1 engine, four built.

Specifications (J/5R)

References

External links

1950s British civil utility aircraft
Auster aircraft
High-wing aircraft
Single-engined tractor aircraft